Helge David Ljungberg (25 November 1904 – 24 November 1983) was a Swedish religious historian and Bishop of Stockholm from 1954 to 1971.

Early life and education
Ljungberg was born in Enköping in Uppsala County, Sweden, the son of David Ljungberg, a priest, and Hilda Jansson. His sister was the politician Blenda Ljungberg.

At Uppsala University he earned Bachelor of Arts degrees in philosophy in 1926 and theology in 1928, and a doctorate in theology in 1938 with a dissertation on the Christianisation of Scandinavia.

Academic career 
From 1938 to 1950, Ljungberg was a docent in the history and psychology of religion at Uppsala University. He was a scholar of Swedish pre-Christian religion and published several books on the subject, including in 1980 the popular work Röde Orm och Vite Krist (Red Serpent and White Christ). He became a member of the Royal Swedish Academy of Sciences in Uppsala in 1958.

Career in the church 
In 1947 he became a vicar at Oscar's Church, and in 1950 pastor of Engelbrekt Parish, both in Stockholm. He also served as a military chaplain. In 1954 he was appointed Bishop of Stockholm. In this capacity, in 1960, he ordained one of the first three woman priests in the Church of Sweden, Elisabeth Djurle. He edited the magazine  from 1941 to 1951 and headed the organisation Pro Fide et Christianismo from 1974 to 1983.

Personal life and death 
Ljungberg married Ruth Sterner in 1928; they had two sons and a daughter.

Selected publications 

 Den nordiska religionen och kristendomen (1938; doctoral dissertation) 
 Fornnordisk livsåskådning (1943)
 Ansgar och Björke (1945) 
 Hur kristendomen kom till Sverige (1946) 
 Tor I (1947; first volume of a projected series on Thor and other thunder gods) 
 Herdabrev till Stockholms stift (1954; pastoral letters)
 Röde Orm och Vite Krist (1980)

References 

 Bra Böckers Lexikon, 1977

External links

1904 births
1983 deaths
Lutheran bishops of Stockholm
20th-century Lutheran bishops
Uppsala University alumni
Academic staff of Uppsala University
Old Norse studies scholars